Hato Paora College is a Catholic, Māori Boys' Boarding school located near Cheltenham, Feilding, New Zealand. It was founded in 1947 under the leadership of Marist Priest, Isaac J Gupwell. It is the largest Boys' Maori Boarding Secondary School in New Zealand.

Notable alumni
 Aroha Awarau, journalist, editor, playwright
 Morvin Edwards, former New Zealand Kiwi Rugby League Player, 
 Max Takuira Matthew Mariu SM (1952–2005), Auxiliary Bishop of Hamilton (1988–2005), first Māori Catholic bishop.
 Shannon Paku, professional rugby union player
 Morvin Simon, composer and kapa haka expert
 Archie John Te Atawhai Taiaroa  (3 January 1937 – 21 September 2010), Māori leader
 Otere Black, professional rugby union player

References

External links
School website

Boarding schools in New Zealand
Boys' schools in New Zealand
Catholic boarding schools
Catholic secondary schools in New Zealand
Secondary schools in Manawatū-Whanganui
Feilding
Educational institutions established in 1947
1947 establishments in New Zealand
Māori schools in New Zealand